The Northern Mariana Islands national under-15 football team is the under-15 football (soccer) team of the Northern Mariana Islands and is controlled by the Northern Mariana Islands Football Association. The team is not a member of FIFA. They have played in the EAFF U-15 Youth Tournament. Their last EAFF U-15 Youth Tournament came in 2018.

Former coaches

  Kiyoshi Sekiguchi

2011 Squad
Selected for 2011 EAFF U-15 Youth Tournament.

References

National under-15 association football teams
Northern Mariana Islands national football team